Bhausaheb Maharaj ( - c. 1914) was the founder of the Inchegeri Sampradaya, to which the well-known Indian guru Nisargadatta Maharaj belonged.

Biography

Background
Bhausaheb Maharaj was born in 1843 as Venkatesh Khanderao Deshpande. Bhausaheb Maharaj belonged to the Deshastha Brahmin caste, the same caste to which the thirteenth century Varkari saint and philosopher Dnyaneshwar belonged, the 16th century sant Eknath, and the 17th century saint and spiritual poet Samarth Ramdas. Dnyaneshwar was universally acclaimed for his commentary on the Bhagvad Gita. Eknath published an extensive poem called the Eknathi Bhagwat in the 16th century. Other works of Eknath include the Bhavartha Ramayana, the Rukmini Swayamwara and the Swatma Sukha. Samarth Ramdas, who was also the spiritual adviser to Shivaji, wrote the Dasbodh.

Spiritual life
According to Kotnis, Bhausaheb Maharj was looked upon as the reincarnation of Sant Tukaram (1577–1650), a prominent Varkari Sant and spiritual poet of the Bhakti, who had taken birth again in the Neelwani Lingayat community to finish his work of spreading the knowledge of Self-realisation. He met his guru Sri Nimbargi at the age of fourteen. At the request of Nimbargi, Bhausaheb Maharaj Deshpande (1843 Umdi - 1914 Inchgiri) received mantra initiation from Shri Raghunathpriya Sadhu Maharaj, who was an ardent follower and a devoted disciple of Shri Gurulingajangam Maharaj. Bhausaheb Maharaj became a disciple of Nimbargi Maharaj.

Teachings

The Ant's Way
Bhausaheb Maharaj's teachings, and those of his student Gurudeo Ranade, have been called Pipilika Marg , "the Ant's way", the way of meditation, while the teachings of his student Siddharameshwar Maharaj, and Siddharameshwar Maharaj's disciples Nisargadatta Maharaj and Ranjit Maharaj have been called Vihangam Marg, "the Bird's Way", the direct path to Self-discovery. Ranjit Maharaj comments:

Nama-Yoga
Bhausaheb Maharaj teachings were collected in a book called Nama-Yoga, a term coined by the compilers and translators of the book, whereas Bhausaheb Maharaj himself called it Jnana Marga, just like Nimbargi Maharaj did. The editors wrote:

Lineage
After his awakening he was authorized by Nimbargi to carry on the lineage, and established the Inchegeri Sampraday. Sri Bhausaheb Maharaj had many students, among which were:
 Sri Amburao Maharaj of Jigjivani (1857 Jigajevani - 1933 Inchgiri)
 Sri Gurudev Ranade of Nimbal
 Girimalleshwar Maharaj
 Sri Siddharameshwar Maharaj (1875-1936)

See also
 Advaita Vedanta

Notes

References

Sources

Published sources

Web-sources

Further reading
Teachings
 
 
Background
 Cathy Boucher, The Lineage of Nine Gurus. The Navnath Sampradaya and Sri Nisargadatta Maharaj

External links
 Gurudev R.D. Ranade, Sadguru Shri Bhausaheb Maharaj Umdikar
 ShantiKuteer Ashram, Bhausaheb Maharaj 
 balkrushnamauli.com, Shri Bhausaheb Maharaj (Nandeshwar)

Inchegeri Sampradaya
Marathi Hindu saints